Emery "Ace" Adams (October 10, 1911 – 1960) was an American baseball pitcher in the Negro leagues. He played from 1932 to 1947 with the Memphis Red Sox, New York Black Yankees, and Baltimore Elite Giants.

References

External links
 and Baseball-Reference Black Baseball Stats and  Seamheads

1911 births
Memphis Red Sox players
New York Black Yankees players
Baltimore Elite Giants players
Baseball players from Tennessee
People from Collierville, Tennessee
1960 deaths
20th-century African-American sportspeople
Baseball pitchers